Ali Aqai Hezarkhani (also Romanized as ‘Alī Āqā'ī Hezārkhānī; also known as ‘Alī Āqā'ī) is a village in Bazan Rural District, in the Central District of Javanrud County, Kermanshah Province, Iran. At the 2006 census, its population was 62, in 14 families.

References 

Populated places in Javanrud County